The Ford Motor Company Assembly Plant at 699 Ponce de Leon Avenue in the Poncey-Highland neighborhood of Atlanta, Georgia was the headquarters of the Ford Motor Company's southeastern US operations from 1915 to 1942.  As a result of good sales in Atlanta, and a desire to decentralize production, Ford established a combined assembly, sales, service and administration facility on Ponce de Leon Avenue, selling a peak of 22,000 vehicles per year.  The assembly plant produced Model Ts, Model As and V-8s until 1942, when the plant was sold to the War Department and a new plant was opened in the Atlanta suburb of Hapeville.

The  building was designed by Ford's in-house architect, John Graham.  An office block in the front was backed by a multi-story loft-style assembly plant.

The War Department used the building as a storage depot and as administrative offices.  Sold for development in 1979, the building is now known as Ford Factory Square or the Ford Factory Lofts and is occupied by apartments and retail shops.  Architects for the adaptive reuse project were Bradfield Associates.

The Kroger supermarket at the Ford Factory is inspiration for the meme Murder Kroger.

Photo gallery

References

External links

 "Field Trip to Murder Kroger", The Plug

Ford factories
Buildings and structures in Atlanta
Former motor vehicle assembly plants
Motor vehicle assembly plants in Georgia (U.S. state)
Industrial landmarks in Atlanta
Industrial buildings completed in 1914
Industrial buildings and structures on the National Register of Historic Places in Georgia (U.S. state)
Motor vehicle manufacturing plants on the National Register of Historic Places
National Register of Historic Places in Atlanta
Transportation buildings and structures on the National Register of Historic Places in Georgia (U.S. state)